Ying Yunwei (7 September 1904 – 17 January 1967) born in Shanghai, was a Chinese director and writer.

Early life
Ying Yunwei at the age of 16 was a poor student growing up. He would spend time with an apprenticeship in foreign trade. He was a pioneer of spoken drama and had a successful career in the shipping industry of Shanghai. A confidential police report stated that Ying's power was linked to his close personal relationship with Du Yuesheng and Huang Jinrong, two of Shanghai's powerful mafia bosses. His apprenticeship in foreign trade however would last up until 1934 where he would promptly resign. In 1921 Ying had participated in an organization known as the Shanghai Drama Association and In August 1930 the China Left-wing Drama Alliance. Ying, during his time in the alliance, participated in the left-wing drama film movement in Shanghai.

Career
Ying Yunwei's film career began in the mid 1930s. During this time he worked for Yuhua and Diantong. A tabloid journalist revealed that Yihua refused to raise his salary, this resulted in Ying's departure and arrival in Mingxing. In 1934, Shanghai Film Studios reestablished itself within a new left-wing film company known as Diantong. Ying would be listed under the director lineup with his film, Plunder of Peach and Plum (also known as Fate of Graduates, 1934). Later in 1934 after his departure from foreign trade Ying would organize the Shanghai Amateur Drama Association and in 1936 work as the executive director of Mingxing's Studio II. When Ying was asked about why he joined Mingxing, Ying stated he was a friend of Zheng Zhengqiu and had already been invited nearly a decade earlier.

In his 1938 film, The Eight Hundred Heroes, it is noted that this film was created during the time of the Battle of Shanghai and that the film Ying directed was a way to boost nation morale in the face of Japanese aggression during this time. In his 1934 film, Plunder of Peach and Plum, it is known to be China's debut as the first complete talkie with a film soundtrack.

Death 
On January 16, 1967, Ying Yunwei was pushed down to death during a rebellion within two factions of the Film Bureau. He died at age 62.

Filmography

References

External links 
 Ying Yunwei on IMDb
 Shanghai Filmmaking: Crossing Borders, Connecting to the Globe by Xuelei, HUANG.
 Ying Yunwei on Douban

1904 births
1967 deaths
Film directors from Shanghai
People persecuted to death during the Cultural Revolution
Chinese theatre directors
Writers from Shanghai